Peter Martyn may refer to:
Peter Martyn (soldier) (1772–1827), Irish soldier
Peter Martyn (actor) (1925–1955), British actor
Peter Martyn (judge), Irish barrister, landowner and judge
Peter Martyn (MP), Member of Parliament (MP) for Helston
Peter H. Martyn (born 1948), Canadian journalist

See also
Peter Martin (disambiguation)